innoPath Software was a software company that provides mobile device management technology to wireless operators and mobile device manufacturers. The technology enables operators to remotely connect, configure, troubleshoot and secure end-user mobile devices.

History
innoPath was founded in 1999 as DoOnGo Technologies. It relaunched in 2003 as InnoPath with firmware over-the-air (FOTA) deployments in Japan, soon spreading to operators in North America. Then the focus became mobile device management. InnoPath was a founding member of the Open Mobile Alliance  and part of the OMA Device Management Working Group, and through these associations donated more than 70 submissions of proprietary source code. InnoPath is also a memberparticipant of the following industry organizations: LiMo Foundation, CTIA - The Wireless Association, GSMA/Mobile World Congress, the Wireless Informatics Forum, WiMAX Forum, and the Symbian Foundation.

innoPath is headquartered in Sunnyvale, California, United States, with international offices including Nacka, Sweden; Beijing, China; Richmond, London, United Kingdom; Tokyo, Japan; and Seoul, Korea.

innoPath device management clients were deployed on  devices by manufacturers including Samsung, Nokia, LG Group and Pantech. InnoPath servers were deployed at operators including AT&T, China Unicom, KDDI, T-Mobile, Verizon.

External links
 Open Mobile Alliance website
 InnoPath website
 LiMo Foundation website

External links
 InnoPath in Telephony
 InnoPath in InfoWorld

Mobile software
Companies based in Sunnyvale, California